Elections to Stirling Council were held on 1 May 2003, the same day as the other Scottish local government elections.

Election results

Ward results

References

2003 Scottish local elections
2003